Vogan is a town and canton located in the Maritime Region of Togo. It is known for its Friday market, which is one of the largest voodoo markets in West Africa. Vogan is primarily inhabited by Ewe people. Vogan has one of the biggest and most colourful markets in  Togo. On Friday, people from Aneho, Lomé, and even Ghana come to buy or sell goods in the Vogan market. Currently, Vogan is ruled by the King senou Odzima KALIPE IV.

Notable people
Joseph Amedokpo, artist
Efo Red, Stand-up comedian
 Alex-Etsri Dosseh-Ayron, author of the national anthem

References

Populated places in Maritime Region
Cantons of Togo